The 7th U-boat Flotilla (German 7. Unterseebootsflottille), also known as  Wegener Flotilla, was the seventh operational U-boat combat unit in the Nazi Germany's Kriegsmarine. Founded on 25 June 1938 under the command of Korvettenkapitän Werner Sobe, it was named in honour of Kapitänleutnant Bernd Wegener. Wegener, a U-boat commander during World War I, died on 19 August 1915 after his submarine U-27 was sunk by British Q-ship HMS Baralong, which was itself a much disputed battle with the Royal Navy accused of war crimes by the German Navy.

The flotilla, under the name "Wegener Flotilla", was founded in Kiel in June 1938. In September 1940, the flotilla left its base in Kiel and moved to St. Nazaire in France. After the change in location, the flotilla was renamed "7th U-boat Flotilla".

This flotilla had one of the most famous emblems from World War II. The emblem, based on a picture seen in a comic book, was adopted by the flotilla while based in St. Nazaire.

Flotilla commanders

U-boats assigned to 7. Unterseebootsflottille

References 

07
Military units and formations of the Kriegsmarine
Military units and formations established in 1938
Military units and formations disestablished in 1944